, short for , is a Japanese light novel series written by Takeru Kasukabe, with illustrations by Yukiwo. Kadokawa Shoten published 12 volumes between February 2012 and February 2016. A manga adaptation by Sayaka Itsuki was serialized in Enterbrain's Famitsu Comic Clear. A ten-episode anime television series adaptation, directed by Takayuki Inagaki and produced by Diomedéa, aired between October and December 2013.

Plot
Kanade Amakusa is a high school student who is suffering from a curse called . This curse requires him to select an action from a list of two or three options that appear before him at any time. He has no control over what choices appear. Many of them are weird or perverse and as a result, the curse has tainted his reputation with his classmates and other people around him, making his life difficult. However, one day, a choice he makes on his way home from school causes a mysterious, beautiful, young girl to fall from the sky. Amakusa discovers that she was sent from the God World to assist him in completing a series of missions given to him directly by God himself. After completing these missions, the "Absolute Choices" curse will be lifted from Amakusa; but should he fail in completing any of the missions, he will be stuck with the curse forever.

As the story progresses, the options change, such as a new option suddenly appearing, or the options suddenly disappearing before a choice is made, or even giving chances to decline all options. According to Amakusa, the three types of options are: options that force the person to take certain actions, options that alter other people physically or mentally who will not retain the memory afterward, and options that have unpredictable outcomes.

Characters

Main characters

, Ikumi Hayama (female form)
Kanade suffers from "Absolute Choices", a curse that forces him to choose one of two or more options. If he doesn't choose, he develops an unbearable migraine. In the beginning, he meets Chocolat and learns that to end the curse, he has to complete a series of "missions". Failing to finish any mission before its deadline will result in the curse staying forever. As the result of "Absolute Choices," his classmates view him as a weird person and thus he has become one of the "Reject Five". He proposes to Chocolat at the end of the series.

The beautiful girl who falls from the sky after Amakusa chooses the option "a beautiful girl falls from the sky" when given an Absolute Choice on his way home from school one day. She chooses the name "Chocolat" when Kanade gives her a box of chocolates to eat. She was sent from the God World to help Kanade complete the "missions" in order to remove the curse. However, she is quite air-headed, making her ineffective when assisting Kanade. According to her, she lost her memory prior to receiving the mission, including how to resolve the curse. In the second novel, she transfers into Kanade's class as his "pet".

Sometimes, when she bumps her head or gets drunk, an inner Chocolat, who has not lost her memories, appears for a short time. Unlike her counterpart, this Chocolat is smart, helpful and has a better idea about the curse. She reverts to her usual self if she bumps her head again or becomes sober. According to her, Chocolat will return to the God World once the curse has ended. At one point, after regaining her memory, she tries to seduce Kanade, but fails because a chocolate box hits her head, returning her to normal.

Reject Five
The  are the five students at Kanade's school who, although they are physically attractive, have certain defects in their personalities.

A girl who sits behind Kanade in class. She has a weird sense of humor and will often tell jokes with a blank expression. She seems to have feelings for Kanade, but exhibits a tsundere attitude towards him. She also has a secret passion for cute things, especially a character called "White Pig", but only reveals this side of her if no one familiar is around.

Kanade's classmate, who normally acts like a naive, hyperactive air-head, but is also smart and constructs strange devices. She is the daughter of the president of UOG, a company that manufactures a large array of products. She is aware of Kanade's missions, although she does not know the reason behind them, and will sometimes try to help.

Kanade's childhood friend. She has a habit of calling everyone older-brother or older-sister. According to her, she will feel ill if she calls anyone anything other than older-brother or older-sister, or if anyone calls her older-sister.

A senior student. She shows interest in both males and females and has even seduced girls whose boyfriends she has stolen. In the fourth light novel, Seira tasks her with making Kanade fall in love with her, but she is unable to do so.

A senior student. He is one of the leaders of the odd students at school and always wears a mask.

Popular Five
The five most popular students in school; the opposite of the Reject Five.

The student council president and leader of the Popular Five. She also knows about Kanade's curse, but instead of helping him, she uses her knowledge to make fun of him. She appears to have some connection to the God World, and knows more about the curse than any other character. According to her, "falling in love" is actually the ultimate mission to remove the curse, yet she refuses to reveal any more detail.

The student council vice president and the most popular boy in school. He is a normal student and is tired of the Reject Five's weird antics. He has five younger sisters, explaining his aversion to 'younger sister' characters. He is calm and cold-hearted.

Yūōji's best friend, she is very pure and innocent. Although she feels embarrassed around male students, as she rarely spends time around them, she wants to learn to do so. She is the third most popular girl in the school and has many admirers who wish to guard her and protect her innocence. If any student attempts to do something of a perverted nature with her, her "guards" will beat that person up. Amakusa has been a victim of several of these beatings, due to his "curse" often requiring him to make perverted decisions.

A proud and harsh female student, she has large breasts and often argues with Yukihira, who is not as well endowed. Amakusa learns that her breasts have been augmented by plastic surgery by means of his curse; Yukihira also becomes aware of this by touching them. Both of them choose to keep her secret. According to Ayame, her harsh personality and the reason for the plastic surgery are both because of her childhood friend who loves tsundere girls.

A freshman. Usually quiet, but who is actually a womanizer.

Others

Amakusa's homeroom teacher who was afflicted with the "Absolute Choices" curse in the past. Although she is able to discuss and share some information about the curse with Amakusa, she is unable to tell him how to end the curse or she starts suffering from painful headaches. She covers for Kanade when he has to choose embarrassing options from the "Absolute Choices" when she can. She has the appearance of an elementary school girl, despite being 29.

The God in charge of Amakusa's "missions" for removing the curse. He is rather sloppy and usually teases Amakusa with the curse, earning him the epithet . According to him, he has just taken the job recently and cannot offer too much help in removing the curse. He also states that he isn't the one who offers the choices; the god that does so is unknown.

Aoi is a feminine looking senior student a who attends Seikou Private School. Despite being in high school like the rest of the characters, he has the appearance of a grade-schooler and the personality of a small child. It is said that he's one of the highest-ranked students in the school.

Kazama is a male student who attends Seikou Private School. He is known as The Beast Of Roses.

Ishioka is a male who attends Seikou Private School. He is known as The Sweets King.

Sakuragawa is another male student at Seikou Private School. He is known as The Emperor In The Nude.

Media

Print
The light novels are written by Takeru Kasukabe, with illustrations by Yukiwo. Kadokawa Shoten published 12 volumes under their Kadokawa Sneaker Bunko imprint between February 1, 2012 and February 1, 2016.

A manga adaptation, illustrated by Sayaka Itsuki, was serialized in Enterbrain's Famitsu Comic Clear online magazine between February 1, 2013 and May 1, 2015. Enterbrain published five tankōbon volumes between July 13, 2013 and June 15, 2015.

Anime
A 10-episode anime television series adaptation, directed by Takayuki Inagaki and produced by Diomedéa, aired in Japan between October 10 and December 12, 2013 on Tokyo MX, Sun TV, and TVQ, and was simulcast by Crunchyroll. The screenplay is written by Hiroko Kanasugi, and chief animation director Hiroyuki Saida based the character design used in the anime on Yukiwo's original concept. The sound director is Takayuki Yamaguchi, and the music is produced by Mages. An additional episode was released on Blu-ray Disc along with the eighth light novel volume on May 20, 2014.

Notes and references
Notes

References

External links
  
 Manga official website 
 Anime official website 
 

2013 anime television series debuts
2012 Japanese novels
2013 manga
Anime and manga based on light novels
Comedy anime and manga
Crunchyroll anime
Diomedéa
Enterbrain manga
Fiction about memory erasure and alteration
Kadokawa Dwango franchises
Kadokawa Sneaker Bunko
Light novels
Madman Entertainment anime
Romance anime and manga
Seinen manga
Sentai Filmworks
Slice of life anime and manga
Television shows based on light novels
Tokyo MX original programming